Trans Island Air 2000 (abbreviated TIA) is an airline from Barbados, with headquarters is in St. Phillip and operates regional charter flights (including cargo) out of its base at Grantley Adams International Airport.

History
The airline was founded in 1982 as Trans Island Air and rebranded as Trans Island Air 2000 in 2000, and at this time operated a mixed fleet including Pilatus Britten-Norman Islanders, Rockwell Aero Commanders, a DHC-6 Twin Otter and an Embraer EMB-110 Bandeirante. TIA2000 has now been approved by all necessary government agencies (Barbados) to re-commence flight operations. It is expected to be fully operational by April 2017. Its web-site, www.tia2000.com, is currently under design development and is expected to launch by April 1, 2017 at the latest.

Official Launch
The airline launch its first schedule flight on May 29, 2017 serving 5 Caribbean Islands, the service from Barbados starts four days a week but as July the various service will operate daily to the Islands launched.

Grounded
The airline announce in of April 2018, that it will temporarily ground its own airlines and reimburse its customers.

Fleet

Destinations
Barbados
 Seawell, Christ Church - Grantley Adams International Airport - (Hub)
Dominica
Roseau - Canefield Airport
Grenada
St. George's - Maurice Bishop International Airport
Saint Lucia
Castries - George F. L. Charles Airport
Saint Vincent and the Grenadines
Kingstown - E.T. Joshua Airport

References 

Defunct airlines of Barbados
Airlines established in 1982
Airlines disestablished in 2004
1982 establishments in Barbados
2004 disestablishments in Barbados